Ya'akov Nitzani (born Ya'akov Chechik; 6 December 1900 – 15 September 1962) was an Israeli politician who served as a member of the Knesset for Mapai from 1952 until 1959.

Biography
Born in Plovdiv, Bulgaria, to a Sephardic Jewish family, Nitzani studied law at the University of Sofia, and also attended a Hebrew teachers seminary. He worked as a teacher from 1920 until 1925, and was a founder of the Organisation for Hebrew Language and Culture. He also helped establish the Bulgarian branches of Hashomer Hatzair and Poale Zion, and was secretary general of the Zionist Organisation in the country.

In 1935, he made aliyah to Mandatory Palestine, and became secretary of the Histadrut's Mizrahi Jews department, as well as becoming a member of the trade union's executive committee and the Tel Aviv Workers Council.

A member of the Mapai central committee, he was on the party's list for the 1951 elections, but failed to win a seat. However, he entered the Knesset on 8 December 1952 as a replacement for Yitzhak Ben-Zvi, who had been elected President. He lost his seat in the July 1955 elections, but returned on 14 November the same year as a replacement for Ya'akov Shimshon Shapira, who had resigned from the Knesset following allegations that his involvement in the oil business was inappropriate for a delegate of workers party. Nitzani lost his seat again in the 1959 elections.

He died in 1962 at the age of 61.

References

External links

1900 births
1962 deaths
Bulgarian Jews in Israel
People from Plovdiv
Bulgarian schoolteachers
Bulgarian emigrants to Mandatory Palestine
Israeli people of Bulgarian-Jewish descent
Israeli trade unionists
Mapai politicians
Members of the 2nd Knesset (1951–1955)
Members of the 3rd Knesset (1955–1959)
Burials at Nahalat Yitzhak Cemetery